World Market, formerly Cost Plus World Market until 2021, is an American chain of specialty/import retail stores, selling home furniture, decor, curtains, rugs, gifts, apparel, coffee, wine, craft beer, and international food products. The brand's name originated from the initial concept, since abandoned, of selling items for "cost plus 10%". Its current headquarters are located in Alameda, California. The company was previously a subsidiary of Bed Bath & Beyond since being acquired in 2012. It was sold in 2021.

History
On 23 October 1958, William Amthor and Lincoln Bartlett opened the first Cost Plus store at 2552 Taylor Street on Fisherman's Wharf in San Francisco, California. This location permanently closed in 2020. Founder William Amthor had been operating a small family-owned furniture store in San Francisco, when he imported a surplus of wicker furniture. Rather than display the wicker pieces in his store, he rented  of warehouse space in the Fisherman's Wharf area of San Francisco. The imported furniture sold quickly, and Amthor began a new business as an importer. When he opened his first store in 1958, it was devoted exclusively to wicker and rattan that he had imported himself. The store was named Cost Plus after Amthor's strategy of pricing the imported goods at cost, plus ten percent.  The stores featured an eclectic mix of imported furniture and home furnishings, displayed in the style of a bazaar. In 1962, with the help of Tandy Corporation, another Cost Plus-named import chain was founded in Texas, named Cost Plus Imports. These stores would, in 1965, be renamed Pier 1 Imports, and would be sold in 1966.

The success in San Francisco led Amthor to quickly open other stores across the Bay Area and later in other states. There are 258 stores spread across 39 states and Washington, D. C.

In 1987, Bechtel Investments (Fremont Group) completed a leveraged buyout.

In the 1990s, "Cost Plus" shifted the branding of its stores to either Cost Plus World Market or simply World Market  in markets new to the brand (generally in the Eastern or Southern regions of the United States). In 1996, Cost Plus World Market went public and began trading on the NASDAQ stock exchange.

In February 2006, Cost Plus reported quarterly earnings of $125 million, with $367 million in revenue for the fourth fiscal quarter of 2006. Annual earnings were $280 million with over $800 million in revenue.
Cost Plus was acquired by Bed Bath & Beyond in 2012.

In 2014, Cost Plus World Market launched an online crowdsourcing-model marketplace called Craft by World Market. The website posts items for one month at a time, and sells only products that have a certain number of pre-orders to ensure that enough customers will buy them.

In October 2019, Bed Bath and Beyond announced pending closure of 60 stores; 40 of the shuttered stores will be Bed Bath and Beyond locations, while 20 will be World Market or other subsidiaries. This was later followed with the company's decision to sell Cost Plus World Market to Kingswood Capital Management by February 2021, in 2020.

References

External links

Home decor retailers
Furniture retailers of the United States
Retail companies based in California
Companies based in Oakland, California
American companies established in 1958
Retail companies established in 1958
1958 establishments in California
2012 mergers and acquisitions
2021 mergers and acquisitions